Yogi is a 2007 Indian Telugu-language action drama film directed by V. V. Vinayak, starring Prabhas and Nayanthara. It also features Ali, Subbaraju, Pradeep Rawat, Sharada and Kota Srinivasa Rao in the supporting roles. Ramana Gogula composed the music for V. V. Vinayak's earlier hit Lakshmi, also composed music for this film. Songs were shot in Canada, Egypt, and Malaysia. This film is a remake of the 2005 Kannada blockbuster film Jogi by Prem. The film released on 12 January 2007 in 225 theatres and was not successful at the box office.

Plot 
Eeswar Chandra Prasad (Prabhas) is the son of Ram Murthy (Chalapathi Rao) and Shantamma (Sharada). Murthy wants his son to do some job. However, Shantamma pampers Eeswar very much, and hence he doesn't want to leave the village. Murthy dies, and in order to fulfil his last wish, Eeswar goes to the city to earn money on the advice of his friend Basha (Ali), who was a pickpocket. Eeswar could not meet Basha.

On the other hand, Kotayya (Kota Srinivasa Rao) runs big land mafia in Hyderabad and is a bitter rival of Narsing Pahilwan (Pradeep Rawat). Saidulu (Subbaraju) is Narsing's brother. Once, Saidulu hacks Kotayya and his assistant, when Eeswar accidentally saves him. Eeswar gets a job in a tea stall run by Chandranna (Chandra Mohan). He earns good money, purchases two gold bangles for his mother, and plans to leave the city. At this juncture, Narsing humiliates Eeswar for saving Kotayya and stamps his mother's gold bangles. Irked over this, Eeswar kills Narsing and turns the biggest goon of the city. Meanwhile, Shantamma reaches Hyderabad as Eeswar killed Narsing. Kotayya wants Eeswar to join him, but to no avail. Chandranna encourages Eeswar, who is now Yogi, to stay back in the city to save the poor, who gets harassed by the goons. Yogi remains a terror for the goons. So, Kotayya and Saidulu join hands and hatch a plan to kill Yogi. While trying to carry it out, Yogi kills Saidulu. Nandini (Nayantara) is also after Yogi for an interview to complete her practicals. Somehow, she falls in love with him. Though Yogi and Shantamma live in the same city, they could not meet each other. One day, Yogi meets Basha, who reveals he saw Shantamma.

Though Basha and Santamma go to the address, they could not find Eeswar because he is known as Yogi for the people. Shantamma waits for her son in front of a temple, as Basha tells her that Yogi is in the habit of visiting the temple every Monday. But Eeswar did not turn up on Monday, fearing attack by Saidulu's people. Shantamma dies in front of the temple, and Basha arranges the funeral for her. At this time, Yogi comes but fails to have a look at the covered face and helps the orphan body lifters with money for cremation. He puts flowers on his mother's body, though he is unaware that the body is his mother's until it is moved to the fire cabin. Basha finally arrives and explains the trauma, but it is too late. Yogi realizes the truth only after Nandini shows the belongings of his mother, who came to see him. The film ends with this emotional scene.

Cast 

 Prabhas as Eeswar Chandra Prasad alias Yogi
 Nayantara as Nandini, Yogi's love interest
 Kota Srinivasa Rao as Kotayya, the main villain
 Pradeep Rawat as Narsing Pahilwan, Kotayya's opposition (guest appearance)
 Subbaraju as Saidulu, Narsing's brother
 Ali as Basha, Yogi's friend
 Sharada as Santhamma, Yogi's mother
 Chalapathi Rao as Ram Moorthi, Yogi's father
 Chandra Mohan as Chandranna, Yogi's supporter
 Fish Venkat as Yogi's henchman
 Devaraj
 Rajan P. Dev
 Venu Madhav
 M. S. Narayana
 Bandla Ganesh
 Raghu Karumanchi
Prabhas Sreenu
 Uttej as Drunkard
 Shankar Melkote as Journalism Professor
 Sunil as Ramu (Cameo appearance)
 Mumaith Khan in item number "Orori Yogi"

Music 
Yogi (Telugu Version)

The music of the film was launched on 15 December 2006. The film has six songs composed by Ramana Gogula:
 "Dolu Baja" - Shankar Mahadevan
 "Orori Yogi" - Karthik & Bangalore Sunitha
 "Ye Nomu Nochindo" - Suresh
 "Gilli Gichi" - Rajesh Krishnan & Ganga
 "Nee Illu Bangaram" - Tippu & Sunitha
 "Gana Gana Gana" - Adnan Sami & Sudha
Murattu Thambi (Tamil version)
 "Kuvalathil Malatharam" - Madhu Balakrishnan
 "Kalakalakala" - Jassie Gift
 "Poramo Yogi" - Vidhu Prathap, Jyostna
 "Eda Kothiyaa" - Afsal
 "Sivapoojakal" - Biju Narayanan
 "Neeyallo" - Vidhu Pratap, Preetha

Reception 
The film opened to mixed reviews. A critic from Rediff.com wrote that "When the director says, 'the feel never ends,' he was probably right. This is a ridiculously sentimental flick not worth wasting money at all".

Box office 
Yogi managed to gross 13.12 crore in its opening week. But the film finally ended up as a commercial failure. The film was later dubbed in Hindi and Malayalam under the same title and in Tamil as Murattu Thambi.

References

External links 
 

2007 films
Films directed by V. V. Vinayak
Telugu remakes of Kannada films
Films shot in Canada
Films shot in Egypt
Films shot in Malaysia
Films shot in Hyderabad, India
Films set in Hyderabad, India
Indian action drama films
Films set in Andhra Pradesh
Films shot in Andhra Pradesh
2000s Telugu-language films
2007 action drama films